Glenn Davis Dynner (born April 11, 1969) is an American author and historian specializing in religion and history of East European Jewry. He is the Co-Editor-in-Chief of Shofar: An Interdisciplinary Journal of Jewish Studies and a Professor and Chair of Religion at Sarah Lawrence College (Chair of Humanities, 2014-16).

Education
Dynner received his B.A. in Comparative History from Brandeis University in 1993, his M.A. in Jewish Studies from McGill University in 1997, and his Ph.D. in Near Eastern & Judaic Studies from Brandeis University in 2002 (supervised by Antony Polonsky). He works primarily in Polish, Yiddish, and Hebrew sources on the Jewish social and religious history in Poland, and specializes in the Hasidic movement.

Media appearances
In 2011, Dynner appeared on NBC's Who Do You Think You Are? with actress Gwyneth Paltrow. Throughout the episode, Dynner helps Gwyneth Paltrow uncover her ancestral Jewish past. On the same show and its spin-offs, he also consulted on the Rashida Jones and Bernie Sanders episodes.

Publications

Books

Chapters
"The Garment of Torah: Clothing Decrees and the First Gerer Rebbe" in Warsaw. The Jewish Metropolis
"Those Who Stayed: Women and Jewish Traditionalism in East Central Europe" in New Directions in the History of the Jews in the Polish Lands
"Jewish Quarters: The Economics of Segregation in the Kingdom of Poland" in Purchasing Power: The Economics of Modern Jewish History

Articles
Dynner, Glenn (July 2018). "Replenishing the 'Fountain of Judaism': Traditionalist Jewish Education in Interwar Poland." Jewish History 31 (3–4): 229–261. 
Dynner, Glenn (Summer 2014). "Brief Kvetches: Notes to a 19th -Century Miracle Worker." Jewish Review of Books 5 (2): 33–35. 
Dynner, Glenn (Winter 2014). "'A Jewish Drunk Is Hard to Find': Jewish Drinking Practices and the Sobriety Stereotype in Eastern Europe." The Jewish Quarterly Review 104 (1): 9–23.

Book Reviews
Dynner, Glenn (Fall 2018). "Visualizing Hasidism." Jewish Review of Books 9 (1): 13–14.

Awards 
2019 - Guggenheim Fellowship
 2017 - Senior Research Scholar at Yale University Library's Fortunoff Video Archive for Holocaust Testimonies
 2016 - The American Jewish Joint Distribution Committee (JDC) Fred and Ellen Lewis Archives Fellowship
 2013–2014 - National Endowment for the Humanities (NEH) Senior Scholar, Center for Jewish History
 2013–2014 - Trustee Faculty Development Fund, Sarah Lawrence College
 2009 - University of Pennsylvania, Katz Center for Advanced Judaic Studies (CAJS) Fellowship theme: “Jews and Commerce”
 2006 - National Jewish Book Awards Finalist for Men of Silk: The Hasidic Conquest of Polish Jewish Society (Oxford University Press, 2008)
 2004 - Koret Jewish Book Award for Men of Silk: The Hasidic Conquest of Polish Jewish Society (Oxford University Press, 2008)
 2000 - Tauber Institute of Modern Jewish Studies Fellowship, Brandeis University
 1999 - U.S. Fulbright Award (Warsaw, Poland)

Teaching
Dynner teaches numerous upper-level seminars at Sarah Lawrence covering the history of Jewish life in Eastern Europe. In the past, his classes included: The Holocaust, Jews and Violence: From the Bible to the Present, and First-Year Studies: Jewish Spirituality and Culture.

Personal 
Dynner's father Alan Roy Dynner is the former VP of Eaton Vance.

External links
 Sarah Lawrence College faculty page
 Academia.edu Glenn Dynner
 Glenn Dynner, Ph.D. Personal Website
 Glenn Dynner's Oral History

References

Sarah Lawrence College faculty
Living people
1969 births
21st-century American historians
American male non-fiction writers
American historians of religion
Historians of Jews and Judaism
Brandeis University alumni
McGill University alumni
21st-century American male writers
Writers from Maryland